Sunder Singh Thakur is  an Indian politician and serving Himachal Pradesh Legislative Assembly from Kullu since 2017.

Thakur is Chief parliamentary secretary of Government of Himachal Pradesh.

Thakur, having degrees in BSc (Medical) and LL.B from Himachal Pradesh University was elected in 2017 and re-elected in 2022.

References 

Living people

1965 births
Indian National Congress politicians from Himachal Pradesh
Himachal Pradesh MLAs 2017–2022
Himachal Pradesh MLAs 2022–2027
People from Kullu district